10 Wings is the album by Japanese singer-songwriter Miyuki Nakajima, released in October 1995.

The album consists of new studio recordings of the songs which she wrote for annual experimental theatres entitled , premiered in November 1989. Some songs already appeared on her previous studio albums released in the 1990s. They were newly recorded with the different interpretations for the album. One of them, remake version of "Two of Us" features Masanori Sera, a frontman of the Twist, on lead vocals. The lead-off track "Two Boats" was used in the 1996 film Kiri no Shigosen.

Lengthy arrangements of all the songs featured on the album are thoroughly altered from its original versions. After release of 10 Wings, Nakajima has released several similar concept albums to date; Hi -Wings- and Tsuki -Wings (1999), and Ten-Sei (2005).

Track listing
All songs written by Miyuki Nakajima, arranged by Ichizō Seo (except "Diamond Cage" co-arranged by Keishi Urata, "Two of Us" and "You Who Will Stay to Live Forever" arranged by David Campbell) 
"" [new recording] – 8:20
 a theme song of "Yakai", first performed on the premier in 1989
"" – 7:50
 a song performed on "Yakai Vol.6 Shangri-La" (1994)
"" – 7:21
 from "Yakai Vol.4 Kinkanshoku" (1992)
"Maybe" [new recording] – 6:51
 from "Yakai 1990"
"" [new recording] – 9:05
 from "Yakai 1990"
"Diamond Cage" – 7:10
 from "Yakai Vol.4 Kinkanshoku" (1992)
"I Love Him" – 5:45
 from "Yakai Vol.3 Kan-Tan" (1991)
"" – 4:15
 from "Yakai Vol.6 Shangri-La" (1994)
"" – 10:54
 from "Yakai Vol.6 Shangri-La" (1994)
"" – 5:00
 from "Yakai Vol.5 Hana no Iro wa Utsuri ni keri na Itazura ni Waga Mi Yo ni Furu Nagame seshi ma ni" (1993)

Personnel
Miyuki Nakajima – vocals
Tsuyoshi Kon – electric guitar
Takahiko Ishikawa – gut guitar
Bob Glaub – electric bass
Neil Stubenhaus – electric bass
Chiharu Mikuzuki – electric and stick bass
Curt Bisquera – drums
Hideo Yamaki – drums
John Guerin – drums
Jun Aoyama – drums
Toru Shigemi – keyboards
Jon Gilutin – acoustic piano
Shingo Kobayashi – acoustic piano, keyboards, jai winding
Yasuharu Nakanishi- acoustic piano, keyboards, and programming (drums, percussion & bass)
Keishi Urata – programming (drums, percussion & bass)
Toshihiko Furumura- alto sax
David Campbell –  strings conductor
Ichizo Seo –  strings conductor
Suzie Katayama –  strings contractor
Sid Page – strings concertmaster
Masatsugu Shinozaki – electric violin
Masatsugu Shinozaki Group – strings
Takashi Asahi – tin whistle
Morinoki Jidou Gasshoudan – chorus on "Two of Us"
Masanori Sera – guest vocal on "Two of Us"
Julia Waters – background vocals
Maxine Waters – background vocals
Mona Lisa Young – background vocals
Carmen Twillie – background vocals
Billie Barnum – background vocals
Luther Waters – background vocals
Oren Waters – background vocals
Terry Wood – background vocals

Charts

Weekly charts

: Limited edition issued on APO-CD

Year-end charts

Certifications

References

Miyuki Nakajima albums
1995 albums
Pony Canyon albums
Japanese-language albums